"Tone It Down" is a song by American rapper Gucci Mane, featuring American singer Chris Brown. It was released on June 20, 2017 as the lead single from Gucci Mane's album Mr. Davis (2017). The song was written by Mane and Brown, and produced by Cardiak and Hitmaka.

Background
"Tone It Down" was released about a month after he dropped the commercial mixtape Droptopwop. Mane and Brown had collaborated on previous releases like Brown's hit single "Party" co-starring Usher, Mane's b-side "MoonWalk" co-starring Akon, and "Ms. Breezy" off Brown's 2010 mixtape In My Zone 2.

Composition
The song is based on a flute-driven production from Cardiak & Hitmaka. Lyrically, the track has Gucci demanding those around him to take his actions seriously and humble themselves, hence the title. "Hold up lil homie tone it down / 'Cause the jewelry that you're rockin' is for kids / I'm a grown up," the rapper insists in his first verse.

Music video
The music video was released August 6, 2017.

Charts

Certifications

Release history

References

2017 singles
Gucci Mane songs
Chris Brown songs
Songs written by Chris Brown
2017 songs
Songs written by Gucci Mane
Songs written by Cardiak
Songs written by Christopher Dotson
Songs written by Hitmaka
Song recordings produced by Yung Berg